Robert I (c. 866 – 15 June 923) was the elected King of West Francia from 922 to 923. Before his election to the throne he was Count of Poitiers, Count of Paris and Marquis of Neustria and Orléans. He succeeded the overthrown Carolingian king Charles the Simple, who in 898 had succeeded Robert's brother, king Odo.

Life
Robert was born in 866 as the posthumous son of Robert the Strong, count of Anjou and Adelaide of Tours. He was the brother of Odo, who was elected king of West Francia in 888. In time West Francia evolved into the Kingdom of France; and under Odo, the royal capital was fixed in Paris. Robert and Odo came from the Robertian dynasty out of which the Capetian dynasty grew.

In 885 Robert participated in the defence of Paris during the Viking siege of Paris. He was appointed by Odo as the ruler of several counties, including the county of Paris, and abbot in commendam of many abbeys. Robert also secured the office of Dux Francorum, a military dignity of high importance.

He did not claim the crown of West Francia when his brother died in 898; instead recognizing the supremacy of the Carolingian king, Charles the Simple. Charles then confirmed Robert in his offices and possessions, after which he continued to defend northern Francia from the attacks of Vikings. Robert defeated a large band of Vikings in the Loire Valley in 921, after which the defeated invaders converted to Christianity and settled near Nantes.

King
The peace between King Charles the Simple and his powerful vassal was not seriously disturbed until about 921 when Charles' favoritism towards Hagano aroused rebellion. Supported by many of the clergy and by some of the most powerful of the Frankish nobles, Robert took up arms, drove Charles into Lotharingia, and was himself crowned king of the Franks (rex Francorum) at Rheims on 29 June 922.

Robert's rule was contested by the Viking leader Rollo, who had settled in the Duchy of Normandy in 911 with the permission of Charles the Simple. During Robert's reign, Rollo remained loyal to Charles, who continued to contest his deposition. Gathering an army, Charles marched against Robert, and on 15 June 923 at the Battle of Soissons Robert was killed. However, his army won the battle and Charles was captured. Charles remained a captive until his death in 929. Robert was succeeded as king by his son-in-law Rudolph, Count of Burgundy, also known as Raoul.

Family
Robert's first wife was Aelis. They had: 
 Adela (name uncertain, sometimes also Adelaide or Adelais), married Herbert II, Count of Vermandois 
 Emma of France, married to Rudolph, Duke of Burgundy

Robert married for the second time  to Beatrice of Vermandois, daughter of Herbert I, Count of Vermandois. Together they had:
Hugh the Great, who was later dux Francorum. Hugh was the father of King Hugh Capet.

References

Sources

10th-century kings of West Francia
Robertians
Frankish warriors
860s births
Year of birth uncertain
923 deaths
Monarchs killed in action